The Arabian Gulf Road, commonly referred to simply as Gulf Road (Arabic spelling: شارع الخليج, Kuwaiti Arabic pronunciation ) is the most prominent road in Kuwait, located in the capital of the country, Kuwait City. It was named as such as it coasts the Persian Gulf (and the smaller body of Kuwait Bay within it) in all of its distance due to its semi-circular shape.

Most of the prominent Kuwait City landmarks are located on the Gulf Road. Those include, but are not limited to, Kuwait Towers, Kuwait National Assembly, Kuwait Stock Exchange, Kuwait Opera House, Dasman Palace, Seef Palace, The Scientific Centre of Kuwait, The Green Island, The Grand Mosque of Kuwait and many foreign embassies and consulates.

See also 
 Roads in Kuwait

Roads in Kuwait